The 2005 Livingston by-election was triggered when Robin Cook, the Labour Party Member of Parliament for Livingston, in Scotland, died on 6 August 2005.

Notice of the vacancy in the constituency was published in the London Gazette on 2 September 2005, which allowed the Speaker of the House of Commons to issue the writ for the election on 8 September under the Recess Elections Act 1975. The poll was held on 29 September, in the week of the Labour Party Conference, when the Labour candidate Jim Devine held the seat for his party.

A by-election for the Glasgow Cathcart seat in the Scottish Parliament was also held on the same day.

Results

Reaction to results
Labour's retention of the seat, albeit with a reduced majority, was regarded by the party with satisfaction. The Scottish National Party was the only party to increase their vote from the general election, and although they did not win, they achieved a swing of 10% from Labour. The Liberal Democrats' share of the vote fell by 0.6%.

There was a swing from Labour to Conservatives of 3%, but given the fourth-place position of the Conservative Party in this seat, and their third-place position in Scotland, the significance of this is debatable.

In 2007 Angela Constance gained the Livingston seat in the Scottish Parliament (which has slightly different boundaries) from Labour.

See also
Livingston (UK Parliament constituency)
Elections in Scotland

References

External links
Campaign literature from the by-election
BBC News: Date is set for Cook by-election
Scottish Election Results 1997 - present

2005 elections in the United Kingdom
2005 in Scotland
2000s elections in Scotland
Politics of West Lothian
By-elections to the Parliament of the United Kingdom in Scottish constituencies